Anna Martin may refer to:

Anna Maxwell Martin (born 1978), English actress
Anna Mebus Martin (1843–1925), American businesswoman and bank president
Anna Martin, character in Unreal (TV series)

See also
Ann Martin (disambiguation)